Bruce Lendon is an Australian diplomat. He has been Australia's High Commissioner to Trinidad and Tobago since 15 October 2019. He also holds accreditation to Antigua and Barbuda, The Bahamas, Barbados. Lendon is a career diplomat with the Australia Department of Foreign Affairs and Trade. He was the former Deputy Head of Mission in Cairo, Egypt.

Lendon holds a BSc in law from the University of Queensland.

References 

Living people
Australian diplomats
University of Queensland alumni
21st-century Australian politicians
Year of birth missing (living people)